Villa Haas is a historical villa in the small city of Sinn, Hesse located at the western edge of the Hörre in Germany (Lahn-Dill-Kreis). The villa, the park and the surrounding streets "Hansastrasse / Rudolfstrasse" are cultural monuments due to their historical and artistical significance.

History
The manor house, the outbuildings and the garden are designed by the Herborner architect Ludwig Hofmann (1862–1933), who was in 1892 appointed by Privy Councillor of Commerce Rudolf Haas, owner of the opposite located "Neuhoffnungshütte". He was cofounder of the association of German “Eisenhüttenleute”, called today steel institute VDEh, and member of the renominated Nassau association of natural history. The “Neuhoffnungshütte” with its iron mines had from its Nassautic beginnings until the Second World War a high strategic importance; it was the economic basis for the metallic prosperity of this area. In 1978 Dr. Klaus F. Müller acquired the villa and park as a co-founder of the German and Europe oral implantology; he used parts of the estate for practical laboratory and advanced training.

Architecture
To the style elements of the two-story, high-volume estate belong rich carved stone formations above the basement level, and window and gable motifs framed with sandstone, that are geared to the German Renaissance Revival architecture. The roof and gable formations with the bell tower look very picturesque. This total impression is strengthened by the superior stairtower with roof helmet, the mining symbol, and the stained glass with motifs of Rhine romanticism from Johann Heinrich Schilbach as well as the detailed facades. The artistic interior décor consists of beautiful stucco and wood work of different historical styles.
Also worth protecting components are the small Chinese pavilion (tea house) and the wrought iron main gate.

Technical unusual features
These are for example a dumbwaiter (elevator), electrical night storage heaters and a lobster tank with, at this time, new air supply. 
The old mechanical tower clock was developed and constructed by Perrot (Calw). Later the clock gets a rare electro mechanical addition. It combines chime works and winch with two electric motors. The mechanical circuit is steered by a mercury switch. The power transmission is made by a vee belt and is still working today.

Garden

The Grade II listed garden area contains, besides rare plants, shrubs and trees, many stylistic elements of the historical park, like the ruin with the ice-house, the cave, the arcades, the pond, the rondell, the fountains, the cherubs, etc. The Chinese pavilion teahouse and the former pavilion which was located at the Dill (river) cliffs is going back to an idea of the German former colonial officer Retzlaff  in Tsingtao. The allusions of a horse path closed in the English style landscape garden are only rudimentarily available.
The park is one of the few preserved recreations of historicism (art) and contains over one hundred different plant species. It is part of the territory Beilstein / Hörre, which was described by Johann Daniel Leers in his book "Flora Herbornensis"  in the biodiversity with exact locations in 1775. These listings are according to Karl Löber "of unsurpassed precision and enable still today an effortless verification." (Quote translated from German).

Villa Haas today

The property is privately owned and can only be visited on request.
As a beautiful backdrop, villa and park are used for photo shoots, cultural events, commercials and films. 
All proceeds go to a social foundation for education in Kampala and Jinja, Uganda, the 22Stars Foundation.

Literature
 Landesamt für Denkmalpflege Hessen (Hrsg.): Lahn-Dill-Kreis I. ( Denkmaltopographie Bundesrepublik Deutschland, Kulturdenkmäler in Hessen.) Friedr. Vieweg & Sohn, Braunschweig / Wiesbaden 1986, .
 Friedhelm Gerecke: Historismus, Jugendstil, Heimatstil in Hessen und im Rheinland. Die Bauten des Architekten und Denkmalpflegers Ludwig Hofmann (1862–1933) aus Herborn. Verlag Michael Imhof, Petersberg 2010, .
 Otto Renkhoff: Nassauische Biographie, Seite 262, .
 Rolf Georg, Rainer Haus, Karsten Porezag: Eisenerzbergbau in Hessen, Seite 329 und 415, .
 Gerd Andriessen:, 100 Jahre W. Ernst Haas und Sohn, Sonderdruck Dillzeitung 26-05-1954.
Klaus F. Müller: Park und Villa Haas - Historismus Kunst und Lebensstil. E-Book , 2013

References

External links
 Official website of Villa Haas

Manor houses in Germany
Buildings and structures in Lahn-Dill-Kreis
Gardens in Hesse
Renaissance Revival architecture in Germany
Articles containing video clips
Houses completed in the 19th century
Villas in Germany
Parks in Germany
Historicist architecture in Germany
19th-century architectural styles
Houses completed in 1892